Alexander (Alex) Beck (born 7 February 1992) is an Australian Olympic athlete. He is a three time defending National champion.

Beck was selected to represent Australia in the  men's 400 metres at the 2020 Summer Games in Tokyo. He ran a personal best of 45.54 to finish sixth in his heat. At the 2022 Oceania Athletics Championships Beck won the gold
medal in the 400 metres race. Beck reached the semi finals of the 400 metres event at the 2022 World Athletics Championships in Eugene, Oregon, with a run of 45.99.

Early years 
From Benowa, Queensland, Beck was aged 16 when he came third in the 400 metres at the Australian Junior Championships. Following that, selection on the Australian World Youth team in 2009 followed and selection for the World Junior Championships the following year. Beck was selected for the Moscow 2013 IAAF World Athletics Championships where he was a member of the team that ran the 4 x 400 metres relay. Beck then competed for Australia in the 4 x 400 metres relay at the 2014 Commonwealth Games.

Achievements 
Beck won the 400 metres Australian championships in 2021, running 46.01 to defeat five time national champion Steve Solomon, before doubling up and being awarded the 200 metres title as well after Abdoulie Asim was disqualified for running out of his lane. This made him the first Australian man in 30 years to win both races in the same year.

Beck completed his Bachelor of Exercise Science degree and then did a Doctor of Physiotherapy degree from Bond University. He is now a qualified physiotherapist.

References

External links
 
 

1992 births
Living people
Australian male sprinters
Olympic athletes of Australia
World Athletics Championships athletes for Australia
Commonwealth Games competitors for Australia
Athletes (track and field) at the 2014 Commonwealth Games
Australian Athletics Championships winners
Athletes (track and field) at the 2020 Summer Olympics
Sportsmen from Queensland